The Wanhua Lin Mansion is a historic mansion in Wanhua District, Taipei, Taiwan.

History
The construction of the mansion started in 1932 and completed in 1935. It used deep foundation and reinforced concrete in its construction process with cement supplied by Asano Cement and discarded railway tracks. In 2013, the building was leased to cultural and creative activities under the Urban Regeneration Office and became the venue for toy exhibition. It was then undergone renovation and finally was opened to the public in April 2016. It was inaugurated by Taipei Mayor Ko Wen-je on 27 May 2016.

Architecture
The mansion is a 4-story building with quadrangular shape. The exterior wall is a mix of biscuit porcelain and Japanese red bricks with several rectangular and arched windows. At the top most floor lies the prayer hall designed with Chinese, Japanese and western architectural styles.

Exhibitions
The ground floor of the building is a café. The third and fourth floors are the gallery about artifacts, documents, tools and photos from the Lin family.

Transportation
The mansion is accessible within walking distance west of Wanhua Station of Taiwan Railways.

See also
 List of tourist attractions in Taiwan

References

External links

 

2016 establishments in Taiwan
Houses in Taiwan
Restaurants in Taiwan
Tourist attractions in Taipei